Tuberculostearic acid is a saturated fatty acid produced by Actinomycetales bacteria.
The name 'Tuberculostearic acid' was coined because it was first isolated in 1927 from the bacteria Mycobacterium tuberculosis.

References

See also
 Thiocarlide

Fatty acids
Alkanoic acids